The 2021–22 season was the 111th season in existence of Clermont Foot and its first in the Ligue 1, the French top flight. In addition to the domestic league, Clermont participated in this season's edition of the Coupe de France.

Players

First-team squad

Out on loan

Transfers

In

Out

Pre-season and friendlies

Competitions

Overall record

Ligue 1

League table

Results summary

Results by round

Matches
The league fixtures were announced on 25 June 2021.

Coupe de France

Statistics

Goalscorers

References

Clermont Foot seasons
Clermont